The Juno clump is a probable main-belt asteroid family that share similar orbital elements to 3 Juno.

3 Juno is a large asteroid with a mean diameter of about 235 km, but the remaining bodies are all small. , the brightest of those clearly in the visible clump would have a diameter of about 6 km, given the same albedo as 3 Juno. This indicates that it is probably a so-called cratering family composed of ejecta from impacts on 3 Juno.

The HCM analysis by (Zappalà 1995) determined several likely core members, whose proper elements lie in the approximate ranges 

At the present epoch, the range of  osculating orbital elements of these core members is

References 
 Zappalà, Vincenzo; Bendjoya, Philippe; Cellino, Alberto; Farinella, Paolo; and Froeschlé, Claude; Asteroid Families: Search of a 12,487-Asteroid Sample Using Two Different Clustering Techniques, Icarus, Volume 116, Issue 2 (August 1995), pages 291–314 

Asteroid groups and families